Splendrillia braunsi is a species of sea snail, a marine gastropod mollusk in the family Drilliidae.

Distribution
This marine species occurs off Japan.

References

 Yokoyama, Matajiro. "Fossils from the Miura Peninsula and its immediate north." (1920).
 Higo, S., Callomon, P. & Goto, Y. (1999). Catalogue and bibliography of the marine shell-bearing Mollusca of Japan. Osaka. : Elle Scientific Publications. 749 pp

External links

braunsi
Gastropods described in 1920